Sainte-Marthe-sur-le-Lac is an off-island suburb of Montreal, in the Canadian province of Quebec, in the Deux-Montagnes Regional County Municipality, 40 km from Montreal. It is crossed from east to west by Route 344, commonly known as Oka Road. The town shares its borders with Deux-Montagnes to the east, Saint-Joseph-du-Lac to the west, the Lake of Two Mountains to the south, and Saint-Eustache to the north.

It shares police, firefighters, waterworks, and other services with the city of Deux-Montagnes.

It was formerly known as a rural town in which most of its inhabitants were seasonal vacationers, but it is increasingly lived in year-round.

Demographics 

Population trend:
 Population in 2021: 19,797 (2016 to 2021 population change: 9.5%)
 Population in 2016: 18,074 (2011 to 2016 population change: 15.2%)
 Population in 2011: 15,689 (2006 to 2011 population change: 38.7%)
 Population in 2006: 11,311 (2001 to 2006 population change: 29.4%)
 Population in 2001: 8,742
 Population in 1996: 8,295
 Population in 1991: 7,410

Mother tongue:
 English as first language: 4.7%
 French as first language: 87.1%
 English and French as first language: 1.1%
 Other as first language: 6.1%

Education
The Commission scolaire de la Seigneurie-des-Mille-Îles (CSSMI) operates Francophone schools. This community has three elementary schools (Horizon-du-Lac, Des-Lucioles, and des Grands-Vents) and one alternative lower secondary school (École secondaire Liberté-Jeunesse). École Polyvalente Deux-Montagnes has upper secondary education. Some areas are served by École des Mésanges and Emmanuel-Chénard, both also in Deux-Montagnes, and Polyvalente Deux-Montagnes (for all secondary levels).

Anglophone schools are operated by the Sir Wilfrid Laurier School Board, and the community is served by Lake of Two Mountains High School, in Deux-Montagnes. Mountainview Elementary School and Saint Jude Elementary School, both in Deux-Montagnes, also serve this community.

References

External links

Cities and towns in Quebec
Incorporated places in Laurentides
Greater Montreal